Flindersia bourjotiana, commonly known as Queensland silver ash, northern silver ash, or white ash, is a species of tree that is endemic to Queensland. It has pinnate leaves arranged in opposite pairs and with between four and eight narrow egg-shaped to elliptic leaflets, greenish white flowers arranged in panicles, and fruit studded with short, rough points.

Description

Taxonomy
Flindersia bourjotiana was first formally described in 1875 by Ferdinand von Mueller in Fragmenta phytographiae Australiae.

Distribution and habitat

Conservation status
Flindersia bourjotiana is classified as of "least concern" under the Queensland Government Nature Conservation Act 1992.

References

bourjotiana
Flora of Queensland
Sapindales of Australia
Trees of Australia
Plants described in 1875
Taxa named by Ferdinand von Mueller